Pakistan competed at the 1968 Summer Olympics in Mexico City, Mexico. The only medal won was a gold medal in men's field hockey. The contingent included only 20 sports persons—18 hockey players and two wrestlers. Pakistan took part in only two disciplines at the Olympiad.

Medalists
 Gold won in the men's field hockey team competition.

Field hockey

Men's Team Competition

Group B
 Defeated  (6-0)
 Defeated  (1-0)
 Defeated  (3-2)
 Defeated  (5-0)
 Defeated  (2-1)
 Defeated  (4-0)
 Defeated  (2-1)

Semifinals
  (1-0) after extra time

Final
 Defeated  (2-1) for the gold medal.

Team Roster

Freestyle Wrestling
Pakistan competed in Freestyle Wrestling at 1968 Summer Olympics.
Those who competed include:

Men's bantamweight (up to 57kg)

 Sardar Mohammad
 1st round; Lost to Donald Behm (USA)
 2nd round; Beat Sukhbaatar Bazaryn (MGL)
 3rd round; Lost to Abutaleb Gorgori (IRN)

Men's lightweight (up to 70kg)

 Taj Mohammad
 1st round; Beat Stefanos Ioannidis (GRE)
 2nd round; Lost to Seyit Agrali (TUR)
 3rd round; Lost to Valtchev Enio (BUL) TKO

References

Nations at the 1968 Summer Olympics
1968 Summer Olympics
1968 in Pakistani sport